Statistics of the Scottish Football League in season 1990–91.

Scottish Premier Division

Scottish League Division One

Scottish League Division Two

See also
1990–91 in Scottish football

References

 
Scottish Football League seasons